Sag Harbor Hills, Azurest, and Ninevah Beach Subdivisions Historic District (SANS) is an African American beachfront community in Sag Harbor, New York. Founded following World War II, the SANS community served primarily as a summer retreat for middle-class African American families during the post-WWII and Jim Crow era. African American families were not allowed at beachfront resorts, pools or beaches, and SANS began as a place of refuge from racial strife. The historic district is bordered by Hempstead Street, Richards Drive, Hampton Street, Lincoln Street, Harding Terrace, Terry Drive and the eastern end of Haven's Beach in Sag Harbor. It was placed on the National Register of Historic Places on July 10, 2019.

Early history

During colonial times, the north-west of East Hampton village was the free black and Native American's enclave along the Indian path to Sag Harbor. When Sag Harbor became the first U.S. port of entry after Northwest Harbor in 1789, the Black and Native populations were relegated to Eastville, southeast of the town. In 1839, due to a growing reluctance to allow blacks in the other churches' burying grounds, the African Methodist Church of Eastville broke ground on a church and cemetery on Eastville Avenue on the southern side of Hampton Street. Reverend J. P. Thompson, the first pastor, is buried in the St David African Methodist Episcopal Zion Cemetery, which accommodated Irish immigrants, Montauketts and African-Americans. The Indian path was paved (NY 114) and in 1945 the road was widened, becoming the main road between the two communities, with the AME church as the spiritual anchor of Eastville. (Eastville is NR Listed as part of Sag Harbor Village Historic District Boundary Increase, 1994.)

The first of the three subdivisions to be developed was Azurest, located to the east of the old Sag Harbor Village Historic District. African-American families began purchasing property for summer retreats during the late 1940s and while unable to get loans, built summer cottages on large lots alternating homesites with lots deliberately left empty. Lot buyers were doctors, business owners, lawyers, academics and artists. Many prominent blacks during the civil rights era bought lots. A Brooklyn schoolteacher, Maude Terry (1887–1968), while vacationing at a cottage in Eastville, came up with the idea of a private community for black families on the 20-acre parcel laying undeveloped between Hampton Street and Gardiner's Bay, which belonged to the Gale family. Amaza Lee Meredith (1895–1984), a black architect and Terry's sister, came up with a plan to sub-divide the property; their descendants, the Richards, still occupy two cottages in the community. With growth during the 1950s and 1960s and the arrival of celebrities like Lena Horne, Harry Belafonte, the restaurateur B. Smith and Allan Houston of the New York Knicks, the community grew to rival Oak Bluffs on Martha's Vineyard as a black vacation destination.

Over 300 Black families bought in, creating the adjoining communities of Sag Harbor Hills and Ninevah Beach, linked by dirt roads. Three other nearby subdivisions, Lighthouse Lane, Hillside Terrace and Chatfield's Hill, also attracted black home buyers, but were not included in the historic designation due to the 50-year rule for contributing properties.

Summers in SANS

Paul Ruffins, former editor of The Crisis magazine for the NAACP, wrote of spending summers at Ninevah Beach when growing up. Each summer SANS residents swelled to 1000, this at a time when Sag Harbor was not the trendy vacation spot it is today. The influx served to buoy the town financially when the Bulova watch factory and Grumman Aircraft plant closed. Ruffins remembers a time when a pair of sunglasses left on the beach was there the next day, walking in the woods of the nature preserve and meeting the other children of the founders. Jim Brannen, a NYFD firefighter and part-time contractor sold John L. Ruffins the lot that became the family retreat. He shared the cottage with Rey and Joan Ruffins, his brother and sister-in-law and their kids. Brennan sold many lots to fellow firefighters. Maude Terry sold many more to entrepreneurs and doctors, civil servants and teachers, the pre-WWII black elite, many of whom – just like their white counterparts – could afford a summer home on the beachfront; people like Earl Graves, the editor of Ebony and Jet magazine; and the owner of the popular J. Foster Phillips Funeral home in St. Albans. Artists built from plans found in Popular Mechanics magazine while camping out in the shell of their cottage. He describes a gentle beach, sloping out for 100 feet with little chop from Gardiner's Bay; a short walk along the shore thru Haven's beach to town for ice cream; sassafras, cedar and scrub oak; clean sand and sailboats anchored offshore; a six-mile bike ride to Sagaponack and the Atlantic's beaches. The trees growing from the sandy soil provided a cover that enabled the "Soul of Summer" to reach a generation of African-Americans.

Gentrification

Due to the proximity of SANS to East Hampton, real estate interests have increasingly targeted the elderly population for turning over their interests, with the goal of building large mansions out of character to the middle class esthetic. House prices have climbed in the Hamptons; Sag Harbor Hills and Ninevah are in the crosshairs of investors looking for bargains. A developer bought 9 parcels, seeking town approval at a recent meeting to build a house of 5,300 square feet on several combined lots, the biggest homes in an area where the median house size is 1,378 square feet. He is opposed by a homeowner group that was originally formed to keep out big-box stores. An even larger manse, of 5,900 square feet, was proposed for four combined lots in Azurest.

Notable visitors and residents
 Olivia Ward Bush-Banks, writer who chronicled the Montauketts, was born in Eastville.
 Langston Hughes, writer/poet of the Harlem Renaissance visited frequently in the 1950s
 Gloria Naylor, writer of stories which centered on the lives of African-American women
 Daisy Tapley, classical performer and race activist in the Woodrow Wilson era
 Edward R. Dudley, Manhattan Borough President and Ambassador to Liberia
 Renee V. H. Simons, President of the nonprofit SANS Sag Harbor which elevated the subdivision to historic district status, and former corporate executive.
 William Pickens, Patriarch of four generations residence in Eastville and noted orator. Former secretary of the NAACP.
 Colson Whitehead, is an American novelist.
 Reynold Ruffins, is an American painter, illustrator, and graphic designer.

Further reading

Gallery

See also
Sag Harbor, novel by Colson Whitehead

References

External links

 Video

 
East Hampton (town), New York
Hamlets in Suffolk County, New York
Populated coastal places in New York (state)
African-American history in the New York metropolitan area
African-American segregation in the United States
African-American resorts
Beaches of Suffolk County, New York
National Register of Historic Places in Suffolk County, New York
Historic districts in Suffolk County, New York
Historic districts on the National Register of Historic Places in New York (state)